Anders Post Jacobsen (born May 21, 1985) is a Danish professional football player. Since 2009 he has played for the Danish 1st Division club FC Hjørring. Since September 2010 he has been studying Electronics and IT engineering, full-time, at Aalborg University.

External links
Vejle Boldklub profile
Danish national team profile

Living people
1985 births
Danish men's footballers
Vejle Boldklub players
Vendsyssel FF players
Association football defenders